The 2012 term of the Supreme Court of the United States began October 1, 2012, and concluded October 6, 2013.  The table illustrates which opinion was filed by each justice in each case and which justices joined each opinion.

Table key

2012 term opinions

2012 term membership and statistics
This was the eighth term of Chief Justice Roberts's tenure and the third term with the same membership.

Notes

References

 

Lists of United States Supreme Court opinions by term